Stuart Rushmere (born 9 September 2000) is an English field hockey player who plays as a midfielder for Surbiton Hockey Club and the England and Great Britain national teams.

Personal
Rushmere attended Millfield School.

Club career
Rushmere currently plays club hockey in the Mens Premier Hockey League for Surbiton Hockey Club.  Surbiton announced the signing of Rushmere on the 1st June 2022.

Previously he had played in the Men's England Hockey League Division 1 North for Loughborough Students.

He has also played for Team Bath Buccaneers.

International career
He made his senior England debut against Spain on 4 February 2022.

References

External links
 
 Stuart Rushmere on EnglandHockey.co.uk
 Stuart Rushmere on EnglandHockey.altiusrt.com

2000 births
Living people
English male field hockey players
Loughborough Students field hockey players
People educated at Millfield
2023 Men's FIH Hockey World Cup players
Commonwealth Games bronze medallists for England
Commonwealth Games medallists in field hockey
Field hockey players at the 2022 Commonwealth Games
Medallists at the 2022 Commonwealth Games